"Kizunguzungu" is a song by Swedish-Tanzanian singer SaRaha. The song was released in Sweden as a digital download on 20 February 2016, and was written by SaRaha along with Anderz Wrethov and Arash Labaf. It took part in Melodifestivalen 2016, and qualified to andra chansen from the third semi-final. In andra chansen, it qualified to the final. It placed ninth in the final.

Track listing

Chart performance

Weekly charts

Release history

References

2015 songs
2016 singles
Melodifestivalen songs of 2016
Songs written by Wrethov
Swahili-language songs
Swedish pop songs
SaRaha songs
English-language Swedish songs
Songs written by Arash (singer)